Pizzo Cavregasco is a mountain of Lombardy, Italy. It has an elevation of 2,535 metres.

Mountains of Lombardy
Mountains of the Alps